44/12.L (also known as Pahri) is a village of Sahiwal District in the Punjab province of Pakistan. It is located at 30°28'0N 72°41'0E with an altitude of 157 metres (518 feet). Neighbouring settlements include Agra and Tirathpur.
It is 8 km south of Chichawatni, at the right bank of Canal 12.L, a branch of the Lower Bari Doab canal.

References

Villages in Sahiwal District
Populated places in Sahiwal District